Gymnopilus nashii is a species of mushroom-forming fungus in the family Hymenogastraceae.

See also

List of Gymnopilus species

nashii
Fungi of North America
Fungi described in 1913
Taxa named by William Alphonso Murrill